Hopkin Bevan (1765–1839) was a Calvinist Methodist minister and writer.

Early life
Born 4 May 1765, his parents were Rees and Mary Bevan of Cilfwnwr, Llangyfelach in Glamorgan. As a boy he attended school in his hometown, and then was schooled in Swansea. He joined the Methodists in Gopa Fach in 1788 and began preaching about 1792.

Career
Ordained in Llandeilo in the summer of 1811, he was among the first ordained Calvinist Methodist ministers. He was a minister at the Bethel chapel in Llangyfelach. His written works include; Ychydig Hanes neu Goffawdwriaeth (1838), Hymnau a Phenillion (1838), and his autobiography (1840). He died 29 December 1839, and was buried in Bethel chapel in Llangyfelach.

References 

1765 births
1839 deaths
Welsh religious leaders
Methodist ministers
Welsh writers
Welsh Methodist hymnwriters